Knettishall is a village and civil parish in the West Suffolk district of Suffolk in eastern England. Located on the south bank of the River Little Ouse (the Norfolk-Suffolk border), in 2005 it had a population of 40. From the 2011 census the population of the village was not maintained and it is included in the civil parish of neighbouring Hopton.

The parish contains Knettishall Heath Country Park and the remains of RAF Knettishall, a World War II airfield.

References

External links

Hopton-cum-Knettishall Parish Council
Knettishall Heath Country Park Suffolk County Council
RAF Knettishall ControlTowers.co.uk

Villages in Suffolk
Civil parishes in Suffolk
Borough of St Edmundsbury